

Champion
On April 1, 1973, before a capacity crowd at St. James, the Portage Terriers captured the Turnbull Memorial Trophy as MJHL Champs. On April 18, 1973, the Terriers were declared winners of the Anavet Cup after the Humboldt Broncos of the Saskatchewan Junior Hockey League withdrew from the series. On May 3, 1973, in Portage, the Terriers won the Abbott Cup advancing to the national final by defeating the Penticton Broncos of the British Columbia Hockey League. At the Winnipeg Arena on May 14, 1973, the Portage Terriers were crowned national champs defeating the Pembroke Lumber Kings of the Central Junior A Hockey League to claim the Centennial Cup.

League notes
The 1973 Portage Terriers were inducted into the Manitoba Hockey Hall of Fame.

Regular season

All-Star game
On February 3, the MJHL staged its Allstar game at Portage with the North Division whipping their South Division counterparts 3-0. Neither team was able to score in the close checking first period, the North went ahead 1-0 in the middle stanza and added two more goals in the final period. Scoring for the North were Murray Thompson, Randy Hextall, and Kelly Secord.

North Division Lineup:
Goal: John Memryk (Portage); Ty Langton (Dauphin)
Defence: John Hewitt (Portage); Chuck Luska (Kenora); George Miller(Portage); Bill Robertson (Portage)
Centre: Charlie Simmer (Kenora); Randy Hextall (Portage); Milt Longworth (Selkirk); Kelly Secord (Dauphin)
Leftwing: Carl Haney (Kenora); Grant Farncombe (Portage); Murray Thompson (Selkirk); Randy Penner (Portage)
Rightwing: Murray Fadden (Kenora); Chuck Naish (Selkirk); Gord Williams (Selkirk); Frank Leswick (Portage)
Muzz MacPherson, Coach (Portage); Ron Scherza, Manager (Selkirk)

South Division Lineup:
Goal: Norm Tesluk (West Kildonan); Murray Bannerman (St. James)
Defence: Brian Engblom (Winnipeg); Doug Mabb (St. Boniface); Greg Tallon (St. James); Garry Bryck (West Kildonan) 
Centre: Jeff Dunsmore (St. Boniface); George Newbury (St. James); Wayne Gogal (Winnipeg)
Leftwing: Pat Meagher (St. Boniface); Dan Moffat (St. James); Cam Connor (St. Boniface)
Rightwing: Joey Cyr (St. Boniface); Perry Gosselin (St. James); Mike Flock (Winnipeg)
Forwards: George Jacobson (West Kildonan); Mark Izzard (West Kildonan)
Ron Russell, Coach (Winnipeg); George Kosarych, Manager (St. Boniface)

Playoffs
Division Semi-Finals
Kenora defeated Selkirk 4-games-to-2
West Kildonan  lost St. Boniface  9-points-to-7 points (8 point series)
Divisional Finals
Portage defeated Kenora 4-games-to-none
St. James defeated St. Boniface 4-games-to-none
Turnbull Cup Championship
Portage defeated St. James 4-games-to-none
Anavet Cup Championship
Portage defeated Humboldt Broncos (SJHL) 3-games-to-2 (Humboldt refuses to finish series)
Abbott Cup Championship
Portage defeated Penticton Broncos  (BCHL) 4-games-to-3
Centennial Cup Championship
Portage defeated Pembroke Lumber Kings  (CJHL) 4-games-to-1

Awards

All-Star Teams

References

 Manitoba Junior Hockey League
 Manitoba Hockey Hall of Fame
 Hockey Hall of Fame
 Winnipeg Free Press Archives
 Brandon Sun Archives

MJHL
Manitoba Junior Hockey League seasons